The Vauxhall 14-6 is an automobile produced by Vauxhall in the United Kingdom from 1939 until 1948.

Announced in early October for the 1938 Earls Court Motor Show the 14-6 was offered as a six-light, four door saloon and was powered by a four bearing, OHV, 1,781cc Straight-six engine. It had a top speed of 70 mph and could accelerate from 0-50 mph in 18.2 seconds.

Engine, transmission and suspension
The previous engine was retained but with compression ratio raised from 6.25 to 6.75:1 and revised timing increasing the output to 48 bhp at 3000rpm. Other features included independent front suspension using torsion bars in place of the previous Dubonnet system with semi-elliptic leaf springs at the rear, Lockheed hydraulic brakes and a three-speed all-synchromesh gearbox in place of the four-speed "silent third" gearbox.

Unitary chassis-body

The car now had a unitary hull which had a  longer wheelbase and  wider track than its predecessor which made it larger than the 12-4 model announced at the same time. Previously the 12 and 14 hp models had shared the same body. Interior features included individual leather front seats and a rear seat with fold-down arm rest, a rear window blind and a sliding sunroof.

Post-war models can be distinguished by bonnet-louvre and grille changes.

45,499 examples were produced, including 30,511 in the post-war period.

Australian production, Vauxhall Senior

A Vauxhall 14 J was built by General Motors-Holden's in Australia without unitary construction which was beyond the capacity of local presses but sharing much of the English car's styling. The separate chassis allowed the Australian firm to provide open and utility bodies. Commencing in 1939, the 14 was offered in sedan, coupé and roadster body-styles. and as in UK but in a Holden version, a light utility. The Australian Vauxhall 14 used the same frame as the Bedford JC, which was also built by Holden in Australia. A roadster utility was also available.

A 14 sedan was the first civilian car to be produced by GMH in the post-war period, leaving the Fishermans Bend assembly line on 21 May 1946.

Notes

References

14-6
Cars introduced in 1939